Grant Andrew Paterson (born 9 June 1960 in Salisbury - now Harare) is a former Zimbabwean cricketer. He played ten One Day Internationals (ODIs) for Zimbabwe between 1981 and 1987.

References

1960 births
Living people
Cricketers from Harare
Zimbabwean people of British descent
White Zimbabwean sportspeople
Zimbabwe One Day International cricketers
Zimbabwean cricketers
Cricketers at the 1983 Cricket World Cup
Cricketers at the 1987 Cricket World Cup